Resurrected or The Resurrected may refer to:

 The Resurrected, a 1991 American horror film
 Resurrected (film), a 1989 British film
 Resurrected (album), a 2008 Witchfinder General album
 Resurrected, a 2003 album by Tony Rich
 Destroyer: Resurrected, a 2012 remix and re-release of Destroyer (Kiss album)

See also
 Resurrection (disambiguation)